The final results of the 2003–04 Azadegan League season were as follows.

References

Azadegan League seasons
Iran
2003–04 in Iranian football leagues